Masiwang may be,

Masiwang River
Masiwang language